Lee James (born 1953) is an American former weightlifter.

Lee James can also refer to:
Lee James (politician) (born 1948), member of the Pennsylvania House of Representatives
Lee S. James (born 1973), English golfer
Lee James (BBC) (fl. 2009), British sports broadcaster
Lee Marshall (footballer, born 1997), Lee James Marshall, English footballer
Lee Ving (born Lee James Capallero in 1950), American musician with punk rock band Fear

See also 
Deborah Lee James (born 1958), US secretary of the Air Force
Jenna Lee-James (born 1977), British actress
Tommy Lee James (active since 2003), American songwriter and producer
Troy Lee James (1924–2007), member of the Ohio House of Representatives
Lee J. Ames (1921–2011), American artist
James Lee (disambiguation)